Country Music Channel (CMC) was an Australian cable and satellite music television channel owned and operated by Foxtel Networks. It was the only country music video channel in Australia, created after the departure of MusicCountry from the Australian market.

Country Music Channel ceased operations at the end of June 2020, and was replaced by a regional version of CMT (owned by Network 10 parent company Paramount Networks UK & Australia).

References

External links 
 Country Music Channel Website

2004 establishments in Australia
Australian country music
Music video networks in Australia
English-language television stations in Australia
Defunct television channels in Australia
Television channels and stations established in 2004
Television channels and stations disestablished in 2020
2020 disestablishments in Australia
Foxtel